Sam & Dave were an American soul and R&B duo who performed together from 1961 until 1981. The tenor (higher) voice was Sam Moore (born 1935) and the baritone/tenor (lower) voice was Dave Prater (1937–1988).

Albums
1966: Hold On, I'm Comin' (Stax 708) (POP #45, R&B #1)
1966: Double Dynamite  (Stax 712) (POP #118, R&B #7)
1967: Soul Men (Stax 725) (POP #62, R&B #5)
1968: I Thank You (Atlantic 8205) (R&B #38)
1975: Back At 'Cha (United Artists LA524-G)

Greatest hits/compilation albums
1966: Sam & Dave (Roulette-Roulette singles compilation)
1969: The Best of Sam & Dave (Atlantic SD-8218) Pop #87/R&B #24
1969: Double Golden Album (Nippon Grammaphone/Atlantic, Japan-Stax/Atlantic Singles)
1978: Sweet & Funky Gold (Gusto, re-recordings of hits)
1982: Soul Study Volume 1 (Odyssey, re-recordings of hits+new covers)
1982: Soul Study Volume 2 (Odyssey, re-recordings of hits+new covers)
1984: I Can't Stand Up for Falling Down (Edsel ED 133 UK: Atlantic & Stax singles not previously released)
1984: The Best of Sam & Dave (Atlantic 81279-1-Y)
1985: Soul Sister, Brown Sugar (Atlantic, Japan compilation LP of Stax/Atlantic releases)

Singles

Appearances on other albums
 1967: The Stax/Volt Revue Volume 1: Live in London (three Sam & Dave tracks, four on UK version)
 1967: The Stax/Volt Revue Volume 2: Live in Paris (three Sam & Dave tracks)
 1967: Stay in School, Don't Be a Dropout (Stax, Promo LP, one Sam & Dave track plus a PSA)
 1976: Jaco Pastorius (Jaco Pastorius album, Sam & Dave vocals on "Come On, Come Over")
 1977: Soul Express (released in Germany by Contempo UK, two Sam & Dave tracks)
 1978: Soul Deep Vol. 2 (released in Germany by Contempo UK, one track "Living It Down"; only known release of this track)
 ?: Hold On I'm Coming (Surprise Records in Belgium, contains five of the six known tracks from the Contempo recording sessions)

CD and DVD collections
 1987: The Best of Sam & Dave (Atlantic)—21 tracks on one CD
 1990: An Anthology of Sam & Dave (Atlantic-Canada)—33 tracks, including extensive bio insert by Rob Bowman. Out of print.
 1991: Sweat & Soul (Rhino CD)—50 tracks, including four previously unreleased tracks and extensive booklet on the duo. Out of print.
 2006: Sam & Dave: The Definitive Soul Collection (Rhino CD)—30 tracks, digitally remastered.
 2007: The 1967 Stax/Volt Revue-Norway (DVD Reelin in the Years)—Four live tracks from spring 1967 tour performing with Booker T. & The MG's and the Mar-Keys. Interviews with Sam Moore & others.
 2008: The Original Soul Men: Sam & Dave (DVD)—21 Sam & Dave tracks, including 17 live tracks from 1966 to 1980, and interview with Sam Moore and others

Note: The original Stax and Atlantic albums are also available on Rhino CD.

Other issues
1982:  "Hold On, Edwin's Coming" (Guv-nor Records)  Single for Louisiana Governor Edwin Edwards' third election campaign.
1985:  The New Sam & Dave Review: A:"Medley-Hold On I'm Comin-You Don't Know-Soul Man-I Thank You Soul Sister, Brown Sugar/B:Hold On" Atlantic 7-99636 (with Sam Daniels & Dave Prater). R&B #92

References

External links
Sam Moore website

Discographies of American artists